The 105th edition of the Tour of Flanders one-day cycling classic took place on 4 April 2021, as the 12th event of the 2021 UCI World Tour. The race began in Antwerp and covered  on the way to the finish in Oudenaarde.

Teams
All nineteen UCI WorldTeams and six UCI ProTeams participated in the race, of which only , with six riders, did not enter the maximum of seven riders. From the field of 174 riders, there were 113 finishers.

UCI WorldTeams

 
 
 
 
 
 
 
 
 
 
 
 
 
 
 
 
 
 
 

UCI ProTeams

Result

References

Notes

External links

2021 UCI World Tour
2021 in Belgian sport
2021
April 2021 sports events in Belgium